St. James is an unincorporated community in Stone County, Arkansas, United States. The Pinky Pruitt Barn, which is listed on the National Register of Historic Places, is located in St. James.

References

Unincorporated communities in Stone County, Arkansas
Unincorporated communities in Arkansas